The family firm John Pilling and Sons Ltd, made hand, dandy and power looms from 1819. It started in Trawden making hand, dandy and then wooden framed wiper power looms and moved to Colne to make cast iron Lancashire Looms in 1849/50. They continued manufacturing until 1980. The firm also owned several weaving mills and remained in business until 2005 as a mill premises management company. During the wars it made huge quantities of shells, grenades, tank and aircraft parts.

History
It started in Trawden making hand, dandy  and then wooden framed wiper power looms and moved to Colne to make cast iron Lancashire Looms in 1849/50

Products

Premises
The firm also owned several weaving mills

Gallery

See also
 Queen Street Mill

References

Footnotes

Notes

Bibliography

External links

A Pilling loom in action at Bancroft Shed

Textile machinery manufacturers
Defunct manufacturing companies of the United Kingdom
1819 establishments in England